Magdalena Fernández (born 1964) is a Venezuelan installation and media artist known for her work with light, sound, and abstractions of nature. Her work has been exhibited internationally at the Venice Biennale, the  Museum of Contemporary Art, Los Angeles, and the Museum of Fine Arts, Houston.

Fernández was born in Caracas, Venezuela in 1964. She lives and works in Caracas. In 1982 she studied Graphic Arts at the Boston University. Between 1983 and 1984 she attended the Andrés Bello Catholic University, UCAB, where she studied education, physical and mathematical mention. In 1985 she joined the Neumann Institute of Caracas, where she graduated as a graphic designer in 1989. In 1990 she began to attend the Scuola Bottega of AG Fronzoni in Milan, Italy, with whom she took a course in Inscape and Graphic Design until 1993. From 1990 to 2000 she worked as a freelance graphic designer in Italy. In 2001 and from 2002 to 2004 she taught workshops called Approach to Space and Practice and Criticism of Contemporary Systems of Visual Representation at the Instituto Universitario de Estudios Superiores de Artes Plásticas Armando Reverón (IUESAPAR) in Caracas.

References

External links 
 www.magdalenafernandez.com

Living people
Venezuelan women artists
Boston University College of Fine Arts alumni
Andrés Bello Catholic University alumni
1964 births